Pachnaeus is a genus of broad-nosed weevils in the family Curculionidae. There are about seven described species in Pachnaeus.

Species
These seven species belong to the genus Pachnaeus:
 Pachnaeus azurescens Gyllenhal, 1834
 Pachnaeus citri Marshall, 1916
 Pachnaeus costatus Perroud, 1853
 Pachnaeus litus (Germar, 1824) (blue-green citrus root weevil)
 Pachnaeus marmoratus Marshall, 1916
 Pachnaeus opalus (Olivier, 1807) (northern citrus root weevil)
 Pachnaeus psittacus (Olivier, 1807)

References

Further reading

External links

 

Entiminae
Curculionidae genera
Taxa named by Carl Johan Schönherr